Indoleamine 2,3-dioxygenase 2 (IDO2) is a protein that in humans is encoded by the IDO2 gene.

Function 

IDO2 (indolamine-2,3-dioxygenase) is an enzyme with protein size of 420 amino acids (47 kDa) that is used for catabolism of tryptophan. In organisms, other enzymes participate in L-tryptophan cleavage, namely IDO1 and TDO. Despite of IDO1 and IDO2 are closely related enzymes originating by gene duplication and sharing high level (43%) of sequence homology, they differentiate by their kinetics, function and expression pattern. Genes encoding IDO1 and IDO2 have similar genomic structure and are situated closely to each other on chromosome 8. IDO2 is produced in a very limited type of tissues as kidney, liver or antigen presenting cells. IDO2 is less active on substrates of IDO1, better catabolizing other Trp derivates as 5-methoxytryptophan. There are several isoforms in population that comes from alternative splicing. As well as IDO1, IDO2 has been reported in Treg differentiation in vitro, suggesting a role in tolerance maintenance. Its expression has been found in several cancers, gastric, colon or renal tumors.

References

Further reading